Santo Domingo is a municipality and town in the Villa Clara Province of Cuba.

It was founded in 1819 and established as a municipality in 1879.

Geography
The town is divided into the wards (barrios) of Este (east) and Oeste (west). The municipality includes the villages of Álvarez, Amaro, Arenas, Baracaldo, Bermejal, Cascajal, Cayo Bejuco, Cerrito, George Washington, Jiquiabo, La Criolla, Las Casimbas, Manacas, Mordazo, Puerto Escondido, Río, Rodrigo, Sabino Hernández, San Bartolomé, San Juan de Amaro, San Marcos, Ulacia (Carlos Baliño), Ventiseis de Julio, Yabucito. Until the 1977 municipal reform, Santo Domingo included Jicotea too, nowadays part of Ranchuelo municipality. 

The wards ("consejos populares" in spanish) of the municipality are Cascajal, Mordazo, Sabino Hernández, Manacas, Washington, La Palma y El Jardín (main town of Santo Domingo), 26 de Julio, and Baliño y Rodrigo-Amaro.

Demographics
In 2004, the municipality of Santo Domingo had a population of 53,840.

See also
Municipalities of Cuba
List of cities in Cuba

References

External links

 Santo Domingo on EcuRed

Populated places in Villa Clara Province
1819 establishments in North America
Populated places established in 1819
1819 establishments in the Spanish Empire